Kathleen Willis (born 1962) is the Illinois state representative for the 77th district. The 77th district includes all or parts of Addison, Bellwood, Bensenville, Franklin Park, Maywood, Melrose Park, Northlake, Stone Park, and Wood Dale.

Early life and education
Kathleen Willis was born and raised in Addison, Illinois. A resident of Addison with her husband and four children, she volunteered as Vice President of the Addison Kiwanis, and an organizer for Dare to Dream, an organization that encourages and assists young Hispanic women in attending college and as a member of the Addison District 4 school board. While on the school board, Willis advocated for lower property taxes, more streamlined school administration and quality education . She also earned a bachelor's in Human Service Administration from Elmhurst College and a master's degree in Library and Information Services from the University of Illinois during her school board tenure.

Illinois State Representative
In late 2011, Willis announced her intention to run for state representative in the newly drawn 77th district during which she was endorsed by, among others, Senator Martin Sandoval and the Illinois Sierra Club. Willis defeated twenty-year incumbent Skip Saviano by over 1,000 votes. Upon being sworn in, Representative Willis joined a bipartisan group of lawmakers who chose not to accept a pension.

In her first term, two of her bills were signed into law by the Governor of Illinois. The first was a bill designed to improve the student placement process for special education signed into law. The second was a bill that prevents minors from purchasing e-cigarettes. Other legislation sponsored by Representative Willis that was signed into law includes legislation that would enhance the penalties for individuals who defraud or attempt to defraud Medicaid, increase the penalty for domestic battery if the abuser is a repeat offender, and create the Young Adults Heroin Use Task Force to address the growing problem of heroin use in high schools in Illinois.

She has also advocated for legislation to prevent gang recruitment by making the practice illegal on school buses, bus stops and public parks, lower crime by prohibiting violent felons from purchasing body armor, and co-sponsored a bill to protect consumers from unfair surcharges.

In 2018, J.B. Pritzker appointed Willis to the gubernatorial transition's Restorative Justice and Safe Communities Committee.

As of July 3, 2022, Representative Willis is a member of the following Illinois House committees:

 (Chairwoman of) Adoption & Child Welfare Committee (HACW)
 Appropriations - Human Services Committee (HAPH)
 (Chairwoman of) Child Care Access & Early Childhood Education Committee (HCEC)
 Counties & Townships Committee (HCOT)
 Elementary & Secondary Education: School Curriculum & Policies Committee (HELM)
 Judiciary - Criminal Committee (HJUC)
 Labor & Commerce Committee (HLBR)
 Minority Impact Analysis Subcommittee (HLBR-MIAS)
 Wage Policy & Study Subcommittee (HLBR-WAGE)

On June 28, 2022, Willis was not renominated to retain her seat in the Illinois House. She was defeated in the Democratic primary by Norma Hernandez.

Electoral history

References

External links 
Representative Kathleen Willis (D) 77th District at the Illinois General Assembly
State Representative Kathleen Willis constituency site
 
Rep. Kathleen Willis at Illinois House Democrats

1962 births
Living people
People from Addison, Illinois
Elmhurst College alumni
University of Illinois School of Information Sciences alumni
Democratic Party members of the Illinois House of Representatives
Women state legislators in Illinois
21st-century American politicians
21st-century American women politicians
School board members in Illinois